Jan Blomme (born 27 May 1959) is a Belgian former cyclist. He competed in the 1000m time trial and team pursuit events at the 1980 Summer Olympics.

References

External links
 

1959 births
Living people
Belgian male cyclists
Olympic cyclists of Belgium
Cyclists at the 1980 Summer Olympics
Cyclists from West Flanders
People from Jabbeke